Akeem Sayeed Priestley (born 13 April 1985) is a Jamaican professional footballer who plays for Canadian club Master's Futbol as a winger.

Club career
Priestley played his college career in the United States at Jacksonville University and also at the University of Connecticut. He was an All-Big East 2nd team selection in 2008, and also lead University of Connecticut to the 2007 Big East title.

Priestley was drafted by Kansas City Wizards in the 2009 MLS SuperDraft (50th overall), but was not offered a contract by the club. Priestley later signed with Jamaican club Harbour View who loaned him out to Azerbaijan based club FK Mughan for the 2009/2010 season.  In April 2011, Priestley signed with the Los Angeles Blues for the season.  He joined Dayton Dutch Lions for the 2012 season.

On 15 August 2013, Priestley signed with RoPS in the Veikkausliiga for the remainder of the 2013 season. In January 2015, Priestley joined Sheikh Russel KC of the Bangladesh Premier League on trial and then signed until July 2015.

On 16 October 2015, after a trial period, Priestley joined Antigua GFC for the remainder of the 2015/2016 season. He scored his first goal for Antigua GFC on 4 November 2015 in a 2–1 home win over Deportivo Mictlán. In 2018, he played in the Canadian Soccer League with CSC Mississauga. In 2019, he joined with Master's Futbol in League1 Ontario.

International career

Priestley was an instrumental member of the Jamaica Under-17 and Under-20 youth national teams from 2002–2005. In October 2004, Priestley made his senior national team debut versus Guatemala in Fort Lauderdale, Florida.

Career statistics

International

Honours

Antigua GFC
Liga Nacional de Guatemala: 1
2015 Apertura

References

External links
 
 USL Pro bio
 

1985 births
Living people
Association football wingers
Jamaican footballers
Sportspeople from Kingston, Jamaica
Jamaican expatriate footballers
Expatriate soccer players in the United States
Jamaican expatriate sportspeople in the United States
Expatriate footballers in Azerbaijan
Jamaican expatriate sportspeople in Azerbaijan
Expatriate footballers in Finland
Jamaican expatriate sportspeople in Finland
Expatriate footballers in Bangladesh
Expatriate footballers in Guatemala
Expatriate footballers in El Salvador
Jamaican expatriate sportspeople in El Salvador
Jamaican expatriate sportspeople in Guatemala
Expatriate soccer players in Canada
Jamaican expatriate sportspeople in Canada
Jacksonville Dolphins men's soccer players
UConn Huskies men's soccer players
Sporting Kansas City draft picks
Harbour View F.C. players
FK Mughan players
Orange County SC players
Dayton Dutch Lions players
Rovaniemen Palloseura players
Sheikh Russel KC players
Antigua GFC players
A.D. Isidro Metapán footballers
National Premier League players
Azerbaijan Premier League players
USL Championship players
Bangladesh Football Premier League players
Liga Nacional de Fútbol de Guatemala players
Salvadoran Primera División players
Canadian Soccer League (1998–present) players
League1 Ontario players
Veikkausliiga players
Jamaica youth international footballers
Jamaica under-20 international footballers
Jamaica international footballers
Master's FA players